Bestla  or Saturn XXXIX is a retrograde irregular moon of Saturn. Its discovery was announced by Scott S. Sheppard, David C. Jewitt, Jan Kleyna, and Brian G. Marsden on 4 May 2005, from observations taken between 13 December 2004 and 5 March 2005.

Description 
Bestla is about 7 kilometres in diameter, and orbits Saturn at an average distance of 20,192,000 km in 1088 days, at an inclination of 147° to the ecliptic (151° to Saturn's equator), in a retrograde direction and with an eccentricity of 0.5145. Early observations from 2005 suggested that Bestla had a very high eccentricity of 0.77. Like many of the outer irregular moons of the giant planets, Bestla's eccentricity may vary as a result of the Kozai mechanism. Bestla's rotation period is  hours. Like Kiviuq, it is likely to be a contact binary or binary object, as its light curve has strong variation in brightness and a plateau-like maximum not seen in the other irregulars.

Name 
This moon was named in April 2007 after Bestla, a frost giantess from Norse mythology, who is a mother of Odin.

References

External links
 Saturn's Known Satellites (by Scott S. Sheppard)
 Jewitt's New Satellites of Saturn page
 IAUC 8523: New Satellites of Saturn May 4, 2005 (discovery)
 IAUC 8826: Satellites of Jupiter and Saturn April 5, 2007 (naming the moon)
 raw Images 

Norse group
Moons of Saturn
Irregular satellites
Discoveries by Scott S. Sheppard
Astronomical objects discovered in 2005
Moons with a retrograde orbit